Agustín Silva (born 28 June 1989) is an Argentine football goalkeeper currently playing for Macará in the Liga PRO Ecuador. He made his first appearance on 10 September 2011 against Tigre.

References

External links
 

1989 births
Living people
Argentine footballers
Argentine expatriate footballers
Association football goalkeepers
Argentine Primera División players
Primera Nacional players
Paraguayan Primera División players
Ecuadorian Serie A players
Estudiantes de La Plata footballers
Club Sol de América footballers
Nueva Chicago footballers
C.S.D. Macará footballers
Expatriate footballers in Paraguay
Expatriate footballers in Ecuador
Argentine expatriate sportspeople in Paraguay
Argentine expatriate sportspeople in Ecuador
Sportspeople from Buenos Aires Province